Koce-Piskuły  is a village in the administrative district of Gmina Ciechanowiec, within Wysokie Mazowieckie County, Podlaskie Voivodeship, in north-eastern Poland.

The village has a population of 100.

References

Villages in Wysokie Mazowieckie County